Ishaat Hussain is an Indian businessman and the former director of Tata Sons and Tata Steel, and  chairman of Tata Sky. He was also chairman of the Tata Group company, Voltas. Between November 2016 and September 2017, he served as the interim chairman of Tata Consultancy Services, following the removal of Cyrus Mistry. He joined the Tata Group in 1981 and retired in September 2017. 

In the media, he has often been called the "Wise Man of Bombay House".

Education
Hussain went to The Doon School in Dehradun, and then obtained a bachelor's degree in economics from St. Stephen's College, Delhi. He then attended the advance management programme at the Harvard Business School.

Career
After graduation, Hussain worked as a chartered accountant for seven years, before joining the Tata Group in 1981  In 1999, he joined the board of Tata Sons. He became chairman of Voltas in 2000, and was appointed to the board, and served as the finance director, of Tata Sons. In November 2016, he was appointed interim chairman of Tata Consultancy Services, after Cyrus Mistry was removed, following the much publicised feud with the board of Tata Sons.

Personal life
Ishaat was married to the famous conceptual artist Rummana Hussain until her death in 1999. They have a daughter, Shazmeen, who married Shaad Ali, son of politician Subhashini Ali and Bollywood filmmaker Muzaffar Ali, in 2006 (div. 2011). She’s currently married to and has a child with Rustom Lawyer.

References

External links
 Tata Consultancy Services

Living people
Tata Group people
1947 births
Tata Consultancy Services people
Indian chief executives
The Doon School alumni
St. Stephen's College, Delhi alumni
Indian business executives
Indian businesspeople